Bjornesfjorden is a lake in the municipality of Nore og Uvdal in Viken county, Norway. It lies at 1,223 meters above sea level. It is drained by the Numedalslågen. Bjornesfjorden is situated in the Hardangervidda plateau and lies within the Hardangervidda National Park.

See also
 List of lakes in Norway

References

Lakes of Viken (county)
Nore og Uvdal